Ivana Marie Trump (February 20, 1949 – July 14, 2022) was a Czech-American businesswoman, media personality, socialite, fashion designer, author, and model. Ivana lived in Canada in the 1970s, before relocating to the United States and marrying Donald Trump in 1977. She held key managerial positions in The Trump Organization, as vice president of interior design, as CEO and president of Trump's Castle casino resort, and as manager of the Plaza Hotel.

Ivana and Donald Trump were prominent figures in New York society throughout the 1980s. The couple's divorce, granted in 1990, was the subject of extensive media coverage. Following the divorce, she developed her own lines of clothing, fashion jewelry, and beauty products which were sold on QVC UK and the Home Shopping Network. She wrote an advice column for Globe called "Ask Ivana" from 1995 through 2010, and published several books, including works of fiction, self-help, and the autobiography Raising Trump.

Early life and education
Ivana Marie Zelníčková was born on February 20, 1949, in the Moravian city of Zlín (known between 1949 and 1990 as Gottwaldov), Czechoslovakia, the daughter of Miloš Zelníček and Marie Zelníčková (née Francová). Her father was an electrical engineer and her mother worked as a telephone operator. He encouraged his daughter's skiing abilities, a practice she began at age four. After developing skills as a skier, she joined the junior national ski team, which offered her opportunities to travel beyond the Soviet-era communist boundaries of what was then the Czechoslovak Socialist Republic. She attended Charles University in Prague and earned a master's degree in physical education in 1972. In 1970, Ivana appeared on Czechoslovak Television in the children's television series Pan Tau.

Accounts differ as to Ivana's history in competitive skiing. It was reported that she was selected as an alternate on the Czechoslovak ski team during the 1972 Winter Olympics, specializing in downhill and slalom. However, in 1989, Petr Pomezný, Secretary General of the Czechoslovak Olympic Committee, denied the claim and stated that despite searching extensively, no record could be found of her involvement.

Immigration to Canada 
In 1971, Zelníčková married Alfred Winklmayr, an Austrian ski instructor and her platonic friend, in order to obtain Austrian citizenship. The marriage granted her the freedom to leave Czechoslovakia without defection so she could retain the right to return to visit her parents. As Ivana Winklmayr, she received her Austrian passport in March 1972. The following year, she obtained an absentee divorce from Alfred Winklmayr in Los Angeles, California, where he had moved to teach skiing.

Zelníčková was romantically involved with the lyricist and playwright George (Jiři) Staidl who was killed in a car accident in 1973. After Staidl's death, Zelníčková moved to Canada where she lived with George (Jiři) Syrovatka whom she had dated since 1967; Syrovatka had defected to Canada in 1971 and owned a ski boutique in Montreal. Zelníčková worked as a ski instructor while living in Canada. She lived in Montreal for two years where she continued to improve her English via night courses at McGill University. Working as a model, Zelníčková told the Montreal Gazette in 1975 that she considered modelling to be a job, rather than a career. Her modelling clients included Eaton's department store and the fashion designer Auckie Sanft, along with promotional work for the 1976 Summer Olympics in Montreal.

Marriage to Donald Trump 

Ivana was in New York City with a group of models in 1976 when she met Donald Trump. On April 9, 1977, the couple married at Marble Collegiate Church in a wedding officiated by Norman Vincent Peale. They became tabloid figures in New York society during the 1980s and worked together on several large projects, including the Trump Tower on Fifth Avenue in Manhattan, the renovation of the Grand Hyatt Hotel in New York City, and the construction of the Trump Taj Mahal Casino Resort in Atlantic City, New Jersey.

During the marriage, Ivana and Donald had three children: Donald Jr. (born 1977), Ivanka Marie (born 1981), and Eric (born 1984). Donald Jr. learned to speak fluent Czech  (with the help of his maternal grandfather), while Ivanka gained only a basic understanding of her mother's native tongue, and Eric was not exposed to the language since, by the time of his birth, his grandparents were comfortable using English.

A reviewer of the 2018 Netflix documentary miniseries on Donald, Trump: An American Dream, described Ivana as a "charismatic workaholic, a career woman, an equal", and a life partner deliberately chosen by Trump to "work beside him and challenge him."

The Trumps' troubled marriage became the subject of public interest over the Christmas holiday in 1989 when—on vacation in Aspen, Colorado—they were observed fighting after Ivana encountered Donald's mistress Marla Maples. The Chicago Tribune reported that by February 1990, Donald had locked Ivana out of her office at the Plaza Hotel, and a legal battle ensued over the legitimacy of the four prenuptial agreements the pair had successively negotiated over the years.

In October 1990, Ivana's 63-year-old father, Miloš Zelníček, died suddenly from a heart attack. According to The Guardian, her father was an informer for Czechoslovakia's Státní bezpečnost (StB) intelligence service who relayed information from his daughter, including a correct prediction that George H. W. Bush would win the 1988 presidential election. Despite their marital troubles and pending divorce, Donald stood at her side at her father's funeral in Zlín held in November 1990.

The Trumps' divorce proceedings received worldwide publicity. Front-page coverage appeared in New York tabloid newspapers for eleven days in a row, and the story was the subject of Liz Smith's entire news coverage for three months. In a deposition relating to their divorce, Ivana accused Donald of rape and of pulling out handfuls of her hair. In Harry Hurt III's book Lost Tycoon: The Many Lives of Donald J. Trump, she confirmed that she had "felt violated". However, in a statement provided by Donald and his lawyers, she said that she had used the word "rape", but she did not "want [her] words to be interpreted in a literal or criminal sense." The uncontested divorce was granted in December 1990 on the grounds of cruel and inhumane treatment by Donald. Ivana had to sign a non-disclosure agreement as a condition of the divorce settlement, and she was required to seek Donald's permission before publicly discussing their marriage. The New York Times reported in 1991 that Ivana's divorce settlement included $14 million, a 45-room Connecticut mansion, an apartment in the Trump Plaza, and the use of Mar-a-Lago for one month a year.

Career
During her marriage to Donald, Ivana took on major roles in The Trump Organization, working as a senior executive for seven years, including executive vice president for interior design. She led the interior design of Trump Tower with its signature pink marble. Ivana was appointed CEO and president of the Trump Castle Hotel and Casino in Atlantic City, later becoming the manager of the Plaza Hotel in Manhattan.

Business ventures
Soon after the divorce, Trump developed lines of clothing, fashion jewelry, and beauty products which have been sold through television shopping channels, including the Home Shopping Network and QVC London. In 1995, she presided over the House of Ivana, a fashion and fragrance company with a showroom located on Park Avenue in New York.

In 1998, she pursued business interests in Croatia (a vacation destination her parents frequently visited), which included the purchase of 33% of the nation's second largest daily newspaper, Polo+10.

The Ivana-branded Bentley Bay development in Miami, Florida, filed for bankruptcy in 2004. The following year, she was involved in several proposed condominium projects, including the never-built Ivana Las Vegas.

In 2010, she sued Finnish fashion company Ivana Helsinki, accusing it of selling women's clothing that incorporated her name without permission.

Writing
Trump wrote several books, including For Love Alone (1992), Free to Love, (1993) and a self-help book called The Best Is Yet to Come: Coping with Divorce and Enjoying Life Again (1995). Trump wrote an advice column about love and life for Globe, titled Ask Ivana, from June 1995 through January 2010.

In February 1999, Trump launched her own lifestyle magazine titled Ivana's Living in Style. She contributed an advice column for Divorce Magazine in 2001.

Trump released an autobiography, Raising Trump, in 2017. It covered her own upbringing and the early years of raising her children with Donald.

Media appearances

Ivana and Donald made several appearances together on television programs including The Oprah Winfrey Show in April 1988, followed by the BBC's Wogan in May 1988. After her divorce from Donald, Ivana was interviewed by Barbara Walters for ABC's 20/20. In 1991, Donald cut off her alimony payments after the interview and announced his intention to sue Ivana for monetary damages. She returned to The Oprah Winfrey Show in 1992 with the message, "I will not let men dominate me anymore."

Trump had a cameo role in the Hollywood film The First Wives Club (1996) with the line, "Ladies, you have to be strong and independent. And remember: don't get mad, get everything." She was the host of a reality TV special titled Ivana Young Man, which aired on Oxygen Network in 2006.  In the reality dating program, she helped a wealthy, middle-aged woman find a younger partner. In 2010, Trump appeared in UK television series, Celebrity Big Brother 7, which she placed 7th.

Personal life 
Ivana Trump was married four times. Her first marriage, to Alfred Winklmayr, was for the goal of securing Austrian nationality, according to a biographer.

She was married to Donald from 1977 to 1990, and they had three children, Donald Jr. in 1977, Ivanka in 1981, and Eric in 1984. She became a naturalized United States citizen in 1988.

Trump married Italian entrepreneur and international businessman Riccardo Mazzucchelli in November 1995. They divorced in 1997. That same year, she filed a $15 million breach of contract suit against Mazzucchelli for violating the confidentiality clause in their prenuptial agreement, while Mazzucchelli sued Ivana and her ex-husband Donald in a British court for libel. The suit was later settled under undisclosed terms.

In the summer of 1997, she began dating Italian aristocrat Count Roffredo Gaetani dell'Aquila d'Aragona Lovatelli. Their relationship continued until his death in 2005.

Trump dated Italian actor and model Rossano Rubicondi for six years before they married on April 12, 2008. The marriage to Rubicondi, 36, was the fourth for Ivana, who was 23 years his senior at the age of 59. The couple's $3 million wedding for 400 guests was hosted by ex-husband Donald at Mar-a-Lago with daughter Ivanka as her maid of honor. The wedding was officiated by Ivana Trump's ex-sister-in-law Judge Maryanne Trump Barry. Although Ivana and Rubicondi divorced less than a year later, their on-again, off-again relationship continued until 2019, when Ivana announced they had once again "called it quits". Rubicondi died on October 29, 2021, at the age of 49, reportedly from melanoma.

Trump had ten grandchildren.  In the late 2010s, she reportedly split her time between New York City, Miami, and Saint-Tropez. She stated she was fluent in German, French, Czech, and Russian.

Death 

On July 14, 2022, at the age of 73, Ivana died of blunt impact injuries to the torso after falling down stairs at her home on the Upper East Side of Manhattan. Her ex-husband Donald and their three children, alongside a number of politicians and celebrities, posted condolences on social media. Her funeral was held on July 20 at the Church of St. Vincent Ferrer, a Roman Catholic church near her home. Ivana was buried at the Trump National Golf Club Bedminster in Bedminster, New Jersey.

Ivana left behind an estate worth $32 million.  In her will, the majority of her assets were to be divided among Don Jr, Ivanka, and Eric. Other beneficiaries include personal friend Evelyne Garnet and the family's former nanny, Dorothy Curry.

Written works

Awards and honors 
  She was awarded Medal of Merit by President of the Czech Republic Miloš Zeman on 28 October 2022.

References

Citations

Cited sources 

  Paperback title: The Greatest Show on Earth: The Deals, the Downfall, the Reinvention.

External links

 
 
 Ivana and Donald Trump video clip from The Oprah Winfrey Show, on April 24, 1988
 Ivana and Donald Trump video clip appearance with Dame Edna on Wogan, BBC, on May 23, 1988

1949 births
2022 deaths
20th-century American businesswomen
20th-century American businesspeople
20th-century American novelists
20th-century American women writers
21st-century American women writers
Accidental deaths from falls
Accidental deaths in New York (state)
American autobiographers
American people of Moravian descent
American women novelists
Businesspeople from New York City
Charles University alumni
Czech businesspeople
Czech expatriates in Canada
Czech female models
Czech socialites
Czech women in business
Czechoslovak emigrants to the United States
Naturalized citizens of the United States
People from the Upper East Side
People from Zlín
Ivana
Women autobiographers
Recipients of Medal of Merit (Czech Republic)